Aubyn Curtiss (July 1, 1925 – August 9, 2017) was an American politician in the state of Montana. She served in the Montana House of Representatives and Montana State Senate.

References

1925 births
2017 deaths
People from Stillwater County, Montana
University of California, Los Angeles alumni
Businesspeople from Montana
Women state legislators in Montana
Republican Party members of the Montana House of Representatives
Republican Party Montana state senators
People from Lincoln County, Montana
20th-century American businesspeople
20th-century American women
21st-century American women